Silver City Kid is a 1944 American Western film directed by John English and written by Taylor Caven. Starring Allan Lane, Peggy Stewart, Wally Vernon, Twinkle Watts, Harry Woods and Frank Jaquet, it was released on July 20, 1944, by Republic Pictures.

Plot

Cast  
Allan Lane as Jack Adams
Peggy Stewart as Ruth Clayton
Wally Vernon as Wildcat Higgens
Twinkle Watts as Twinkle Clayton
Harry Woods as Judge Sam H. Ballard
Frank Jaquet as William Stoner
Lane Chandler as Steve Clayton
Glenn Strange as Henchman Garvey
Bud Geary as Henchman Yeager
Tom Steele as Henchman Utah
Tom London as Sheriff Gibson
Jack Kirk as Tom 
Sam Flint as Business Man

References

External links 
 

1944 films
American Western (genre) films
1944 Western (genre) films
Republic Pictures films
Films directed by John English
American black-and-white films
1940s English-language films
1940s American films